Lu Yen-hsun was the defending champion and successfully defended his title.

Lu won the title after defeating Hiroki Moriya 6–3, 6–1 in the final.

Seeds

Draw

Finals

Top half

Bottom half

References
Main Draw
Qualifying Draw

Ningbo Challenger - Singles